Red Rocks: 7/8/78 is a three-CD live album by the rock band the Grateful Dead.  It was recorded on July 8, 1978, at Red Rocks Amphitheatre in Morrison, Colorado.  It was released on May 13, 2016.  The same concert was also released as part of the box set July 1978: The Complete Recordings.

Critical reception

Stephen Thomas Erlewine, writing on AllMusic, said, "If any Dead show could be called a full-on party — when they get to the concert-closing "Werewolves of London", it feels like a triumph — it's this, and while the good times are infectious, what lingers is how the band is exceptionally tight on this night. Whether they're boogying to blues and rock & roll or stretching to the edge of space, everybody feels in sync and the results are exhilarating."

Track listing
Disc 1
First set:
"Bertha" > (Jerry Garcia, Robert Hunter) – 6:43
"Good Lovin'" (Rudy Clark, Artie Resnick) – 6:40
"Dire Wolf" (Garcia, Hunter) – 4:07
"El Paso" (Marty Robbins) – 4:24
"It Must Have Been the Roses" (Hunter) – 7:16
"New Minglewood Blues" (traditional, arranged by Grateful Dead) – 6:09
"Ramble On Rose" (Garcia, Hunter) – 8:34
"Promised Land" (Chuck Berry) – 4:37
"Deal" (Garcia, Hunter) – 6:26
Second set:
"Samson and Delilah" (traditional, arranged by Grateful Dead) – 7:44
"Ship of Fools" (Garcia, Hunter) – 7:29
Disc 2
"Estimated Prophet" > (Bob Weir, John Barlow) – 13:08
"The Other One" > (Weir, Bill Kreutzmann) – 8:51
"Eyes of the World" > (Garcia, Hunter) – 10:34
"Rhythm Devils" > (Mickey Hart, Kreutzmann) – 10:29
"Space" > (Garcia, Phil Lesh, Weir) – 5:03
"Wharf Rat" > (Garcia, Hunter) – 8:43
"Franklin's Tower" > (Garcia, Kreutzmann, Hunter) – 10:38
"Sugar Magnolia" (Weir, Hunter) – 9:31
Disc 3
Encore:
"Terrapin Station" > (Garcia, Hunter) – 10:54
"One More Saturday Night" (Weir) – 5:13
"Werewolves of London" (LeRoy Marinell, Waddy Wachtel, Warren Zevon) – 6:44

Personnel
Grateful Dead
Jerry Garcia – guitar, vocals
Donna Jean Godchaux – vocals
Keith Godchaux – keyboards, vocals
Mickey Hart – drums
Bill Kreutzmann – drums
Phil Lesh – bass
Bob Weir – guitar, vocals
Production
Produced by Grateful Dead
Produced for release by David Lemieux
Executive producer: Mark Pinkus
Associate producers: Doran Tyson, Ivette Ramos
Rhino legal: Patti Coleman
Recording: Betty Cantor-Jackson
Tape restoration: Rob Eaton
Mastering: Jeffrey Norman
Tape-to-digital transfer: John K. Chester, Jamie Howarth
Art direction, design: Steve Vance, Doran Tyson
Artwork: Paul Pope
Photos: Keith Stieduhar
Tape research: Michael Wesley Johnson
Archival research: Nicholas Meriwether
Liner notes: David Lemieux

Charts

References

Grateful Dead live albums
2016 live albums
Rhino Entertainment live albums